Rising Kingdoms is a real-time strategy PC game developed by Haemimont Games and published by Black Bean Games. It was released June 17, 2005. Rising Kingdoms is a realtime strategy game set in a fantasy world, which focuses on empire development and dynamic tactical battles and features both strategy and adventure modes in the fantasy world of Equiada. In strategy mode, the player is able to select 3 major races – Humans, Foresters and Darklings, and in addition to these three primary races, the player is able to capture, enslave and develop five independent nations – Shades, Nomads, Dragons, Trolls, and Elves. Combined with the player's main race they provide a valuable asset when clashing with their opponents. In adventure mode the player controls a group of heroes and a small squad of troops uncovering dark secrets and surprising twists as the adventure unfolds.

The game got a digital re-release on the Steam digital platform on July 23, 2019, and that it supports multiplayer over LAN on the service.

References

External links 
 
  at Haemimont Games

2005 video games
Real-time strategy video games
Video games developed in Bulgaria
Windows games
Windows-only games
Black Bean Games games
Multiplayer and single-player video games